Babagwa (English: The Spider's Lair) is a 2013 Filipino drama film written and directed by Jason Paul Laxamana. The film stars Alex Medina as Greg, an internet scammer who falls in love with a wealthy old maid while trying to swindle her using a fake Facebook profile. The film competed under the New Breed section of the 9th Cinemalaya Independent Film Festival. It went on to be screened in film festivals in Hawaii, Cleveland, Vancouver, and Warsaw.

Synopsis 
Greg (Alex Medina) uses a fake Facebook account to trick people into depositing money into his bank account. Assuming the persona of a fictional guy named Bam (Kiko Matos), he flirts with a filthy rich woman that he met online. But in time, he falls in love with Daisy (Alma Concepcion) and is confused whether he will push through with the scam or admit his feelings for Daisy.

Cast 
Alex Medina as Greg
Joey Paras as Marney
Alma Concepcion as Daisy
Kiko Matos as Bam
Nico Antonio as Peewee
Chanel Latorre

Awards 
9th Cinemalaya Independent Film Festival (New Breed)
Best Supporting Actor – Joey Paras

References

External links 

2013 films
Philippine drama films
Philippine independent films
2013 drama films
2013 independent films